The 137th Infantry Division was a major fighting formation of the German Army (Wehrmacht). It was created in October 1940, and first saw combat in Operation Barbarossa as part of Army Group Centre. The division remained on the central sector of the Eastern Front, where it participated in heavy fighting.

By November 1943, the division's losses on the Eastern Front were so high that it only consisted of two infantry regiments. This was followed by the withdrawal from the front, where the division was disbanded. The remaining troops were converted into Division Group 137.

The staff of the former division was reassigned to the 271st Infantry Division. Division Group 137 became subordinated to Korps-Abteilung E, which was also set up in November 1943, under Army Group Center.

Commanders 
 Generalleutnant Friedrich Bergmann 8 October 1940 – 21 December 1941;
 Oberst Siegfried Heine 21 December 1941 – 28 December 1941;
 Oberst Muhl 28 December 1941 – 5 January 1942;
 Generalleutnant Hans Kamecke 5 January 1942 – 12 February 1942;
 Generalleutnant Dr. Karl Rüdiger 12 February 1942 – 25 February 1942;
 Generalleutnant Hans Kamecke 25 February 1942 – 15 October 1942;
 Generalleutnant Egon von Neindorff 15 October 1942 – 16 December 1943.

Order of battle

1940
Infantry Regiment 447
Infantry Regiment 448
Infantry Regiment 449
Artillery Regiment 137
Pionier-Bataillon 137
Antitank Battalion 137
Reconnaissance Battalion 137
Divisions Signals-Battalion 137
Divisions Services 137

1943
Grenadier Regiment 447
Grenadier Regiment 448
Division Battalion 137
Artillery Regiment 137
Pionier-Bataillon 137
Panzerjäger-Abteilung 137
Feldersatz-Bataillon 137
Divisions-Nachrichten-Abteilung 137
Divisions-Nachschubführer 137

References

Military units and formations established in 1940
Military units and formations disestablished in 1943
Infantry divisions of Germany during World War II